Rudolf Lukac (born  in Považská Bystrica) is a Slovak male weightlifter, competing in the 77 kg category and representing Slovakia at international competitions. He participated at the 1996 Summer Olympics in the 70 kg event and at the 2004 Summer Olympics in the 77 kg event. He competed at world championships, most recently at the 2007 World Weightlifting Championships.

Major results

References

External links
 

1969 births
Living people
Slovak male weightlifters
Weightlifters at the 1996 Summer Olympics
Olympic weightlifters of Slovakia
Sportspeople from Považská Bystrica
Weightlifters at the 2004 Summer Olympics